Cyttariales are an order of ascomycete fungi. Many of them cause serious plant diseases. The order contains 1 family (the Cyttariaceae), 2 genera, and 11 species.

References

Leotiomycetes